Zora (Italian: Zora la Vampira) is an Italian comic book erotic character from the 1970s.  Zora la Vampira ("Zora the vampiress") is one of many such characters from the Italian fumetti tradition. Other figures from the same era, and with similarly violent or erotic preoccupations, include Maghella, Lucifera, Biancaneve, Vartan, Jacula, Sukia, and Yra.

History 
The first comic book was published in 1972. Zora la vampira was published from 1972 to 1985 and featured a blond female protagonist who, on some covers, resembles French actress Catherine Deneuve. The series was published by Edifumetto. The cartoonists were Renzo Barbieri and Giuseppe Pederiali as writers and Birago Balzano as artist. Emanuele Taglietti and Alessandro Biffignandi painted the majority of the covers for the series.

Together with the original series, stories of Zora were published also in the comic magazines Orror, I Notturni and Fasma. The series was also published with some success in France, where new stories were produced even after the closing of the series in Italy. A new 13 episodes miniseries of Zora, renamed as "Lady Vampyre", was published in 2001; cartoonists were Paolo Puccini and Daniele Statella.

Plot 
The character's real name is Zora Pabst, a 19th-century aristocrat who has been possessed by the spirit of Dracula. She travels her way around the world and even into outer space, satisfying her sexual desires and her lust for blood. Her adventures are a mixture of horror, eroticism, and pornography.

Legacy 
A film inspired by the character, also named Zora la Vampira, was released in 2000, directed by the Manetti Brothers.

References

Italian comics titles
1972 comics debuts
Comics characters introduced in 1972
Fictional people from the 19th-century
1985 comics endings
Erotic comics
Horror comics
Vampires in comics
Works set in the 19th century
Italian comics characters
Comics about women
Italian comics adapted into films
Female characters in comics
Comics based on Dracula
Comics about spirit possession